Ben Idrissa Dermé (21 January 1982 – 11 September 2016) was a Burkinabé professional footballer who played as a centre back.

Career
Born in Abra, Dermé played club football in Burkino Faso, Moldova, and France for Étoile Filante, Sheriff Tiraspol, US Ouagadougou, USC Corte, CA Bastia, ÉF Bastia and AJ Biguglia.

He earned three caps for the Burkina Faso national team between 2006 and 2010.

Dermé died on 11 September 2016 following a heart attack during a 2016–17 Coupe de France match.

References

1982 births
2016 deaths
Association football defenders
Burkinabé footballers
Burkina Faso international footballers
Étoile Filante de Ouagadougou players
FC Sheriff Tiraspol players
US Ouagadougou players
USC Corte players
CA Bastia players
ÉF Bastia players
Moldovan Super Liga players
Championnat National 2 players
Championnat National players
Ligue 2 players
Burkinabé expatriate footballers
Burkinabé expatriate sportspeople in Moldova
Expatriate footballers in Moldova
Burkinabé expatriate sportspeople in France
Expatriate footballers in France
Association football players who died while playing
Sport deaths in France
21st-century Burkinabé people